Darkbuster is a punk rock band hailing from Boston, Massachusetts, known largely for their songs about the joys of heavy drinking, which have earned them a strong following in the American Northeast. The band occasionally performs under the name of P Diddler And The Fearsome Foursome.

Background and band history
The band was formed by singer/guitarist Lenny Lashley, drummer Eric Edmonston, and bassist Mike Gurley in 1996 and developed a following around Massachusetts. In 1997 the band recorded a nine-song demo tape, and in 1999 released their debut album, 22 Songs You'll Never Want To Hear Again! The album instantly cemented their reputation in the Boston punk scene, filled with songs about beer, being a loser, and even a few juvenile-but-hilarious potshots at other local bands (and even the group's own members). Shortly after they released a split EP titled Skullbuster with the Skullys a high school punk band from Stoughton, MA they often gigged with. Songs include: "Waste of Life," "Join the NRA," and "Some Cunt Sneezed on my Sub".

In 2000 the band added a second guitarist, Paul Delano. In addition, Danny O'Halloran replaced Edmonston as the group's drummer a few months later, and it was this lineup of Lashley, Gurley, Delano, and O'Halloran which won the WBCN Rock & Roll Rumble that year.

In 2001 the band recorded five songs for a split EP with Tommy and the Terrors.  The new songs received mixed reviews from the group's fans, some of whom felt that the new songs were "too serious." Lashley decided to break up the band the same week, following a grinding month-long U.S. tour. 

Lashley continued writing songs and formed a country band, Lenny and the Piss Poor Boys, in 2002, which developed an audience of its own.  Gurley moved on to The U.S.M., then to The McGunks.  O'Halloran joined The Marvels, and Delano joined Avoid One Thing.  Following his departure from the band, Edmonston formed a group called Linus.

In May 2005, Lashley injured his left hand in a construction accident at Boston University, leaving him unable to play guitar for several months.  The band temporarily brought Amy Griffin (Raging Teens/Avoid One Thing) on board as a second guitarist.  A DVD containing concert footage of Darkbuster and Lenny and the Piss Poor Boys was released shortly after the accident, with proceeds set aside to help Lashley with his medical bills.  A 2005 benefit concert featuring both of Lashley's bands performing with guest singers also raised money to help cover his medical bills. Shortly after in December 2005, it was announced that Edmonston would again be leaving the band at the end of the year, with Griffin becoming a full member and Lashley returning to guitar duties.

In May 2006 the band signed with I Scream Records, who re-released A Weakness For Spirits in August 2006.  The band was rumored to be compiling footage for a 10th anniversary DVD.

Darkbuster band members have participated in various side projects during their active years as well as their moments of hiatus. In July 2005 Gurley and Edmonston released an album entitled 90 Miles From Launch To Target from their side project band, Drago. In October 2006 Lashley's country band Lenny and the Piss Poor Boys released their eponymous debut album on Lude Boy Records. Unfortunately, John Erik Johnson, the bass player for Lenny and the Piss Poor Boys and the Bourbonaires, died on January 17, 2007. Lenny Lashley continued to make music with his solo project Lenny Lashley's Gang of One as well as Street Dogs.

Although an official breakup was never announced, the band stopped performing and went on a hiatus. It wasn't until December 27, 2009, that Darkbuster played their first show in almost two years at Boston's House Of Blues for the 12th Mighty Mighty Bosstones' Hometown Throwdown.

In 2015, after eight years of recording, Darkbuster released No Revolution under Pirates Press Records. The release was paired with several sold-out nights of "Reunion" concerts in August 2015. Unfortunately, many of the original members were not involved in the performances.

Discography
22 Songs You'll Never Want To Hear Again! (1999)
Skullbuster (1999)
Live N' Loaded At The Middle East (2000)
Darkbuster Vs. Tommy & The Terrors (2001)
A Weakness For Spirits (2005)
No Revolution (2015)

See also
Hardcore punk music

References

External links
Darkbuster Myspace

Musical groups from Boston
Punk rock groups from Massachusetts